John Sandford may refer to:

John Sandford (poet) (1565–1629), English clergyman and academic
John Sandford (novelist) (born 1944), American novelist and journalist
John Sandford (cricketer)  (1832–1892), English cricketer
John Edmondson, 2nd Baron Sandford (1920–2009), English naval commander, priest and politician
John Sandford (Archdeacon of Coventry) (1801–1873)
John de Sandford (died 1294), Archbishop of Dublin

See also
 John Sanford (disambiguation)